Weeping Mary is an unincorporated community in Cherokee County, Texas, United States. It is significant as the community closest to the ancient Caddo Mounds State Historic Site.

History 

Weeping Mary was founded by recently freed slaves shortly after the Civil War. The community later founded a Baptist church. The community had a few scattered houses in the 1930s and gained a church in 1990. Demographic changes took place after a boll weevil infestation destroyed the cotton crops, and mechanization reduced the need for farm labor. Many people left in the Great Migration, seeking jobs on the West Coast, especially during and after World War II, when more defense industry jobs were available. The population was 40 in 2000.

On April 13, 2019, an EF-3 tornado struck the community, destroying several homes and the Caddo Mounds museum, killing two people and injuring 20 others.

Urban legends about the name 
There are two known legends about how Weeping Mary got its name.  The first says that the name refers to Mary Magdalene crying at Jesus' tomb. In another version, the town was named for a former slave who cried after losing her land, as the government had promised it would not be taken away.

Geography

Education 
The community founded a local school for their children in 1896 and had a record of 40 pupils. It was still operational in the 1930s. It closed after the American Civil War. Students living in Weeping Mary are within the Alto Independent School District.

References

External links
 Scenes And Sorrows: A Portrait Of Weeping Mary - photos and stories about how the town got its name

Unincorporated communities in Texas
Unincorporated communities in Cherokee County, Texas